Emma Tiedemann is a play-by-play sports announcer, one of the original four female broadcasters in Minor League Baseball. She has announced for basketball, football, soccer, softball and volleyball games.

She works for the Portland Sea Dogs as Director of Broadcasting. She is the team's fifth lead broadcaster in their entire history, beating out approximately 150 other applicants for the job. At her first day on the job in March 2020, the staff received the news they would all be working from home and the Minor League season shut down shortly thereafter. Tiedemann spent her first work week studying baseball statistics, putting together game notes and working on hiring a broadcasting partner for home games. As of 2021 she was back in the stadium and on the road with the team.

Tiedemann's first professional job was being a play-by-play and color analyst for the Mat-Su Miners in the summertime Alaska Baseball League. That experience led her to feel that she wanted to specifically work in baseball and applied to a number of teams, getting a job as the Broadcast and Communications Manager with the Medford Rogues in the summertime West Coast League. She was the team's broadcaster as well as communications manager. She worked as a number two broadcaster, Broadcast and Media Relations Assistant, for St. Paul Saints alongside play-by-play broadcaster Sean Aronson. In 2018 she  became the Lexington Legends primary play-by-play broadcaster serving as their Director of Broadcasting & Media Relations. In 2018 she was also named the play-by-play announcer for Morehead State University's women's basketball team, the first woman to hold that position.  In 2019, she was honored as the South Atlantic League Media Relations Director of the Year.

Tiedemann says she has a traditional style since she learned the craft from her grandfather and listening to tapes of Red Barber. As someone working in the minor leagues, she says her work days can consist of "...social media, pulling tarp, broadcast preparation, corporate sales, graphic design, selling tickets, being the mascot and many other things all before that 7:05 p.m. first pitch." As of 2019 she said that she'd gotten to call a Championship Series in her first year with every team, finally getting to call a winning Championship for the Legends in 2018.

Early life and education
Tiedemann grew up in the Dallas suburbs, the granddaughter of Texas sports broadcaster Bill Mercer, the first voice of the Texas Rangers. She would occasionally do play-by-play work at basketball with her grandfather for the University of Texas at Dallas while still in high school. She enrolled at the University of Missouri and worked doing sportscasting for the school station KCOU. She graduated in 2015 with a bachelor's degree in secondary education and a minor in history.

References

Living people
Minor League Baseball broadcasters
Women sports announcers
Year of birth missing (living people)